Mauro Ezequiel Bazan (born 27 April 1993 in Lomas de Zamora, Argentina) is an Argentine footballer who plays right back. He first played for Racing Club, in the Argentina Primera Division, and later played for Guillermo Brown de Puerto Madryn, in the Primera B Nacional.

Clubs

Titlés

References

 

1993 births
People from Lomas de Zamora
Argentine footballers
Living people
Association football defenders
Sportspeople from Buenos Aires Province